Highlights and Lowlives is the eighth studio album by American rock band Blue Cheer, released in 1990 and produced by Jack Endino. The bonus track Blues Cadillac is on some versions/releases and can be hidden on some of the CDs.

Track listing
"Urban Soldiers" (Dickie Peterson) – 4:09
"Hunter of Love" (Duck MacDonald, Peterson) – 5:32
"Girl from London" (MacDonald, Peterson) – 5:40
"Blue Steel Dues" (MacDonald, Peterson) – 6:19
"Big Trouble in Paradise" (Peterson, Rainer) – 4:11
"Flight of the Enola Gay" (MacDonald, Peterson) – 3:49
"Hoochie Coochie Man" (Willie Dixon) – 5:56
"Down and Dirty" (MacDonald, Peterson) – 4:35

Bonus track
"Blues Cadillac" (Peterson) – 3:49

Personnel
Blue Cheer
Dickie Peterson – bass guitar, lead vocals
Duck MacDonald – lead guitar, backing vocals
Paul Whaley – drums

Production
Jack Endino – producer
Dave Anderson, Ivor Mladek – engineers
Rainer Kleber – mastering
Roland Hofmann – executive producer

References

1990 albums
Blue Cheer albums
Albums produced by Jack Endino